Paradise Ridge is a low ridge that parallels the coast at the head of Ross Ice Shelf, located east of Amundsen Glacier and midway between MacDonald Nunataks and O'Brien Peak. Mapped by United States Geological Survey (USGS) from surveys and U.S. Navy air photos, 1960–64. So named by New Zealand Geological Survey Antarctic Expedition (NZGSAE), 1969–70, because the ridge is rather flat on top and provides easy traversing.

Ridges of Antarctica
Amundsen Coast